Matías Eduardo Manrique (born 1 November 1980, in Mendoza) was an Argentine football defender.

He played for clubs like Independiente de Avellaneda, Peñarol or Chile's Ñublense.

Club career
Manrique started his professional playing career in 2001 with Independiente. He played for Arsenal de Sarandí between 2002 and 2004, when he returned to Independiente.

In 2006 Manrique joined Uruguayan team Danubio and in 2007 he joined Peñarol where he was part of the squad that won the Clausura 2008 tournament.

Titles

References

External links
 Profile at Tenfield
 Argentine Primera statistics
 Soccerway Profile
 BDFA.com.ar Profile

1980 births
Living people
Sportspeople from Mendoza, Argentina
Argentine footballers
Association football defenders
Club Atlético Independiente footballers
Arsenal de Sarandí footballers
Club Atlético Huracán footballers
Chacarita Juniors footballers
Danubio F.C. players
Peñarol players
Ñublense footballers
Argentine Primera División players
Argentine expatriate footballers
Expatriate footballers in Chile
Expatriate footballers in Uruguay